Christophe Kabongo (born 27 August 2003) is a Czech professional footballer who plays as a midfielder for FK Železiarne Podbrezová, on loan from Lommel.

Career statistics

Club

Notes

References

2003 births
Living people
Czech footballers
Czech expatriate footballers
Czech Republic youth international footballers
Association football midfielders
AC Sparta Prague players
Lommel S.K. players
FK Železiarne Podbrezová players
Czech First League players
Czech expatriate sportspeople in Belgium
Expatriate footballers in Belgium
Czech expatriate sportspeople in Slovakia
Expatriate footballers in Slovakia
Czech people of Democratic Republic of the Congo descent